A Crystal Christmas was the first holiday album by Crystal Gayle.  All the songs on this album are classic holiday compositions with no new songs. It was released in October 1986.

Track listing

Chart performance

References

Crystal Gayle albums
1986 Christmas albums
Christmas albums by American artists
Warner Records albums
Albums produced by Jim Ed Norman
Country Christmas albums